Tropicana Field (commonly known as the Trop) is a multi-purpose domed stadium located in St. Petersburg, Florida, United States. The stadium has been the home of the Tampa Bay Rays of Major League Baseball (MLB) since the team's inaugural season in 1998. The stadium is also used for college football, and from December 2008 to December 2017 was the home of the St. Petersburg Bowl, an annual postseason bowl game. The venue is currently the only non-retractable domed stadium in Major League Baseball, making it the only year-round indoor venue in MLB. Tropicana Field is the smallest MLB stadium by seating capacity when obstructed-view rows in the uppermost sections are covered with tarps as they are for most Rays games.

Tropicana Field opened in 1990 and was originally known as the Florida Suncoast Dome. In 1993, the Tampa Bay Lightning moved to the facility and its name was changed to the ThunderDome until the team moved to their new home in downtown Tampa in 1996. In October 1996, Tropicana Products, a fruit juice company then based in nearby Bradenton, signed a 30-year naming rights deal.

History

After Tampa was awarded the Tampa Bay Buccaneers and Tampa Bay Rowdies in the 1970s, St. Petersburg decided it wanted a share of the professional sports scene in Tampa Bay. City officials decided early on that the city would attempt to attract Major League Baseball. Possible designs for a baseball park or multi-purpose stadium were proposed as early as 1983. One such design, in the same location where Tropicana Field would ultimately be built, called for an open-air stadium with a circus tent-like covering. It took several design cues from Kauffman Stadium, including fountains beyond the outfield wall.

Ultimately, city officials decided that a stadium with a fixed permanent dome was necessary for a prospective major league team to be viable in the area, due to its hot, humid summers and frequent thunderstorms. Ballpark construction began in 1986 in the hope that it would lure a Major League Baseball team to the facility.

The stadium, built originally as the Florida Suncoast Dome, was first used in an attempt to entice the Chicago White Sox to relocate if a new ballpark was not built to replace the aging Comiskey Park. The governments of Chicago and Illinois eventually agreed to build a New Comiskey Park in 1989.

1990s
The stadium was finished in 1990. It hosted the 1990 Davis Cup Finals that autumn, as well as several rock concerts, but still had no tenants. The venue helped make St. Petersburg a finalist in the MLB expansion for 1993, but it lost out to Miami and Denver. There were rumors of the Seattle Mariners moving in the early part of the 1990s, and the San Francisco Giants came close to moving to the area, with Tampa Bay investors announcing their purchase of the team and its relocation in a press conference in 1992. However, the sale and move were blocked by National League owners, who voted against the deal in November 1992 under pressure from San Francisco officials and the then-owner of the Florida Marlins, Blockbuster Video Chairman H. Wayne Huizenga. A local boycott of Blockbuster Video stores occurred for several years thereafter.

The Suncoast Dome finally got a regular tenant in 1991, when the Arena Football League's Tampa Bay Storm made their debut. Two years later, the National Hockey League's Tampa Bay Lightning made the stadium their home for three seasons. In the process, the Suncoast Dome was renamed the ThunderDome. Because of the large capacity of what was basically a park built for baseball, several NHL and AFL attendance records were set during the Lightning and Storm's tenures there.

Finally, in 1995, the ThunderDome received a baseball team when MLB expanded to the Tampa Bay area. Changes were made to the stadium and its naming rights were sold to Tropicana Products, who renamed it Tropicana Field in 1996. The completion of what is now Amalie Arena in downtown Tampa permitted "The Trop" to be vacated for preparation for its intended purpose, as the Lightning and Storm moved into that facility. A US$70 million renovation then took place—to upgrade a stadium that had cost $130 million to complete only eight years earlier. Ebbets Field was the model for the renovations, which included a replica of the famous rotunda that greeted Dodger fans for many years. The first regular season baseball game took place at the park on March 31, 1998, when the Devil Rays faced the Detroit Tigers, losing 11–6. Luis Gonzalez of the Tigers hit the first home run at the stadium during the game, and Wade Boggs hit the first Devil Rays home run later in the game. Boggs would also hit a home run for his 3,000th hit at Tropicana Field in 1999.

Although Tropicana was purchased by PepsiCo in 1998, PepsiCo did not elect to make any changes to Tropicana's naming rights, as the Tropicana brand is popular among the local fanbase.

2000s
The park was initially built with an AstroTurf surface, but it was replaced in 2000 by softer FieldTurf. A new version of FieldTurf, FieldTurf Duo, was installed prior to the 2007 season. It has always featured a traditional "full dirt" infield, instead of the "sliding pits" design that was common during the 1970s and 1980s, making it the first artificial turf field with a full dirt infield since Busch Stadium II in 1976. Since Tropicana Field does not need to convert between baseball and football, sliding pits, designed to save re-configuration time, were unnecessary. The only other artificial turf field in MLB, Rogers Centre in Toronto, converted to the full dirt infield after the departure of the Toronto Argonauts to BMO Field. Tropicana has hosted football games, but never during baseball season. On August 6, 2007, the AstroTurf warning track was replaced by brown-colored stone filled FieldTurf Duo.

Tropicana Field underwent a further $25 million facelift prior to the 2006 season. Another $10 million in improvements were added during the season. In 2006, the Devil Rays added a live Cownose ray tank to Tropicana Field. The tank is located just behind the center field wall, in clear view of the play on the field. People can go up to the tank to touch the creatures. Further improvements prior to the 2007 offseason, in addition to the new FieldTurf, include additional family features in the right field area, the creation of a new premium club, and several new video boards including a new  Daktronics LED main video board that is four times larger than the original video board. The 2007 renovation also added built-in HDTV capabilities to the ballpark, with Fox Sports Florida and WXPX airing at least a quarter of the schedule in HD in 2007 and accommodating the new video board's 16x9 aspect ratio.

On September 3, 2008, in a game between the Rays and the New York Yankees, Tropicana Field saw the first official use of instant replay in the history of Major League Baseball. The disputed play involved a home run hit above the left field foul pole by Yankee Alex Rodriguez. The ball was called a home run on the field, but was close enough that the umpires opted to view the replay to verify the call. Later, the Trop saw the first case of a call being overturned by instant replay, when a fly ball by Carlos Peña originally ruled a ground-rule double due to fan interference, was overturned and made a home run on September 19. The umpires determined that the fan in question, originally believed to have reached over the right field wall, did not reach over the wall.

In October 2008, Tropicana Field hosted its first ever baseball postseason games as the Rays met the Chicago White Sox in the American League Division Series, the Boston Red Sox in the American League Championship Series, and the Philadelphia Phillies in the World Series. It hosted the on-field trophy presentations for the Rays when they became the American League Champions on October 19, following Game 7 of the ALCS. Chase Utley hit the first ever World Series home run at Tropicana Field during the first inning of Game 1 of the 2008 World Series. The Rays ended up losing the game 3–2 and eventually the World Series to the Phillies 4 games to 1.

Since 2008, the top ⅓ of the upper deck seating has been tarped over, artificially reducing the stadium's capacity to 36,048 for the 2008 regular season. It was further reduced to 35,041 for the 2008 postseason, since the 300-level Party Deck had been reserved by Major League Baseball as an auxiliary press area. On October 14, 2008, the Rays announced that the upper deck tarps would be removed for the remainder of the postseason, starting with a Game 6 of the 2008 American League Championship Series. This increased the capacity of the stadium to nearly 41,000, depending on standing-room-only tickets sold.

2010s
The first no-hitter pitched at Tropicana Field took place on June 25, 2010, thrown by Edwin Jackson of the Arizona Diamondbacks, who had been a member of the Rays from 2006 to 2008.

About one month after Jackson's no-hitter on July 26, 2010, Tropicana Field was the site of the first no-hitter in Rays' history when pitcher Matt Garza achieved the feat. Garza faced the minimum 27 batters, as the only opponent to reach base (on a walk) was erased by a double play hit by the following batter.

On June 24, 2013, in a game against the Toronto Blue Jays, three Rays players – James Loney, Wil Myers, and Sam Fuld – hit consecutive home runs, a first at Tropicana Field.

Because of rioting in Baltimore, a series between the Rays and Baltimore Orioles in May 2015 was moved from Oriole Park at Camden Yards to Tropicana Field. The games were played with the Orioles serving as the home team and the Rays serving as the visiting team.

Due to severe flooding caused by Hurricane Harvey in the Houston area, the Houston Astros played one "home" series at Tropicana Field in August 2017 against the Texas Rangers while the Rays were away on a previously scheduled road trip. This was only the fourth time games were moved to a neutral location due to weather. Coincidentally, in advance of Hurricane Irma arriving in the Tampa Bay area two weeks later, the Rays' home series against the New York Yankees was moved to Citi Field, the home stadium of the Yankees' crosstown rivals, the New York Mets.

In July 2018, a proposal was unveiled to replace the facility with Ybor Stadium. However, later that year at the MLB Winter Owners Meeting, it was announced by Tampa Bay Rays owner Stuart Sternberg that the Ybor stadium plan would not go forward. The current stadium lease between the Rays and the City of St. Petersburg runs through 2027. The city granted the Rays until December 31, 2018, to continue negotiations with Hillsborough County officials. Although MLB commissioner Rob Manfred has stated his support for "the ballpark effort and [his] desire to be [help] in assisting all parties in finding a way to keep the Rays in the Tampa-St. Petersburg area", he also went on to say that the Rays should "explore a path that is in the best interests of his Club and Major League Baseball".

In addition, the relocation announcement sparked a flurry of redevelopment proposals submitted to the City of St. Petersburg. There are proposals to eliminate the structure completely, but efforts have been made to include the public in the debate using several community meetings.

For the 2019 season, Tropicana Field closed its upper decks, as part of efforts and renovations to "create a more intimate, entertaining and appealing experience for our fans". This reduced the stadium's capacity to around 25,000–the lowest in the league. The team's average attendance in the 2018 season was only just over 14,000.

2020s 
From December 2020 to April 2021, the stadium hosted the professional wrestling promotion WWE, broadcasting its shows from a behind closed doors set called the WWE ThunderDome. Due to the start of the 2021 Tampa Bay Rays season, the promotion relocated to Yuengling Center in Tampa.

On January 26, 2021, seven different proposals to redevelop the Tropicana Field site were unveiled, both with and without a new stadium.

Features

Architectural

The most recognizable exterior feature of Tropicana Field is the slanted roof. It was designed at an angle to reduce the interior volume in order to reduce cooling costs, and to better protect the stadium from hurricanes. The dome is supported by a tensegrity structure and is lit up with orange lights after the Rays win a home game. When the Minnesota Twins vacated the Hubert H. Humphrey Metrodome following the 2009 season and moved into Target Field in 2010, Tropicana Field became the only active Major League Baseball stadium with a fixed (i.e., not retractable) roof. The catwalks attached to the non-retractable roof have been rare but occasional obstructions in the way of batted balls.

The main rotunda, on the east end of the stadium, resembles the Ebbets Field rotunda on the interior. It was the largest outdoor tile mosaic in Florida, and the fifth-largest in the United States. It was sponsored by Florida Power Corporation, which is now a part of Duke Energy.

The primary 100-level concourse is at street level, with elevators, escalators and stairs separating the outfield and infield sections, since the ground is at different grades on either side. The 200-level loge box concourse is further separated, and is carpeted, as it includes the entrances to most of the luxury suites. The 300-level concourse is the highest of the concourses.

Gates 
There are seven gate entrances/exits to Tropicana Field, numbered in a clockwise fashion. Gate 1 is the main entrance, known as the Rotunda, on the right-field side of the stadium. Gate 4 is a VIP-only entrance, while Gate 7 is for stadium and team personnel only.

Dining and amenities

Seating at Tropicana Field is arranged with odd sections on the third base side and even sections on the first base side. The hallway behind sections 133–149 is nicknamed "Left Field Street." The hallway behind sections 136–150 is nicknamed "Right Field Street." The 100-level seating wraps around the entire field with a 360° walkway. Behind the stadium's batter's eye is a center field common area, known as The Porch, which provides fans with open seating and standing room to watch games. The Porch, along with other facility improvements, was part of a multimillion-dollar renovation project that was completed before the start of the 2014 season. Loge boxes are featured along the infield of the 100-level from foul pole to foul pole. 200-level seating features 20 sections along the foul lines, broken by the press box behind home plate, with the luxury boxes directly behind and above them. 300-level seating wraps around the infield along the lines, and also features the "Party Deck", a small-capacity seating area above the left field outfield seats with separate concessions inside; initially sponsored by tbt*, the Party Deck has been sponsored by GTE Financial since the 2019 season. Rows are lettered starting closest to home plate and rise further away. Seats are numbered starting at the left side of the section.

There are a total of 70 luxury suites. 48 are accessible from the 200-level, while the other 15 are located on the 100-level.

There are a total of 2,776 club seats at Tropicana Field. The Dex Imaging Home Plate Club features its own entrance, recliner seats, and a premium buffet with in-seat service. The second club section, the Rays Club, is along the first-base side on the 100-level at the Loge Box level. It features its own premium buffet and premium seating.

MacDillville is a section located on the right field line, behind the Rays' bullpen. The section is reserved for the 24 tickets that the Rays provide to personnel returning from deployment, families of deployed personnel and staff assigned to MacDill Air Force Base.

Field-level party sections were installed in the corners in 2006. The left field party section is available for groups of 75-136 people and named "162 Landing", in reference to Evan Longoria's walk-off home run in the 162nd and final regular season game of the  season that landed in that section, which clinched the American League wild card for the Rays. In 2017 the section was renamed after the Tampa sports bar, "Ducky's" that is featured in The Porch, and co-owned by Evan Longoria; the Ducky's branding was removed following the trade of Longoria to the San Francisco Giants before the 2018 season, and 162 Landing has been sponsored by Hard Rock Café since the 2018 season. The right field party section is the "Papa John's Bullpen Box" and is available for groups of 50–85. When the right field corner was sponsored by the fast food chain Checkers, tickets to the "Checkers Bullpen Cafe" included a free meal at the Checkers kiosk immediately adjacent to the section. As of 2008, both party sections feature all-you-can-eat buffets.

In 2008, the Rays also set aside a section of the press boxes on the right field side, named "Press Level Party Area", as an all-you-can-eat buffet section with typical ballpark fare. It is usually available for group parties of at least 35, but it is available for individual ticketing on select dates.

In 2019, the Rays introduced the Left Field Ledge, a party section above the section of the 360 walkway behind left field, offering tables for groups of eight and patio boxes for groups of 12 to 24.

The St. Anthony's Fan Care Clinic is located between Gates 3 and 4 on the 100 level, section 102 (behind home plate). St. Anthony's Health Medical Team staffs the clinic and offers first aid services to fans. A Baby Care Suite is located on the 300 level near section 300. It features baby changing stations and private nursing suites.

Located throughout the first floor walkway are multiple apparel and gear stores, and interactive experiences for fans.

One of the team's two main apparel stores is located in the stadium, near gate 1. The other main store, The Tampa Pro Shop & Ticket Outlet, is located in Tampa. Many specialty, smaller, stores are located throughout the stadium, including a "Game-Used Merchandise" store located in Center Field Street.

Interactive experiences include:
 Grand Slam Alley: an arcade-style area sponsored by GameTime, located behind section 133, free on Sundays
 Topps: fans can have their picture put on a Rays baseball card, located in Left Field, free on Sundays
 Home Run Derby / Speed Pitch: a hitting and pitching simulator, located behind section 134, free on Sundays
 Raymond's Art Studio: An art studio featuring either coloring pages or crafts, and a blackboard wall (for fans 14 and under), located in Right Field Street near Gate 1 (Free)
 Interactive Playground: A virtual interactive que of games that cycle every three minutes, located between Raymond's Art Studio and the Rays Touch Tank (Free)

The Rays Touch Tank
Just over the right-center field fence is the Rays Touch Tank. This ,  tank is filled with three different species of rays, including cownose rays that were taken from Tampa Bay waters. The tank is one of the 10 biggest in the nation. Admission to the tank area is free for all fans attending home games, but there is a limit of 40 people in the area at any given time. The tank is open to fans about twenty minutes after the gates open and closes to the public two hours after the first pitch. Fans get to see the rays up close and get to learn educational info about them.

The tank and rays are sponsored and maintained by the Florida Aquarium, and educates people about rays and other aquatic life.

For every ball hit into the tank during a game by a Rays player, the Rays would donate $5,000 to charity with $2,500 going to the Florida Aquarium and $2,500 going to that player's charity of choice. To date, only seven players have hit a home run that landed in the tank:

* Denotes walk-off home run.

As of the 2021 season, the netting over the tank was extended to fully enclose the area, removing the possibility of a home run ball entering the tank.

Concessions
Behind center field on the stadium's ground level near the main rotunda entrance is a two-story full-service restaurant and recreational area called BallPark & Rec, opened in 2018. The restaurant's second floor features an outdoor area with lawn games, as well as an indoor arcade area. This restaurant took over the location previously occupied by Everglades Brewhouse, which served several craft beers in addition to having a full liquor bar and opened two hours before first pitch. A "Fan vs. Food" challenge at Everglades was introduced in 2014, which consists of eating a  burger and a pound of french fries in under 30 minutes to win two future Rays game tickets and a T-shirt.

The Cuesta-Rey Cigar Bar was located upstairs from Everglades Brewhouse, accessible by escalator, and across from The Porch in center field, prior to BallPark & Rec's expansion. It offered a large selection of cigars, many produced by a company founded in Tampa. The lounge also featured a regular bar, open seating with leather upholstery, and a large screen T.V. It was the only indoor location at Tropicana Field where smoking is permitted.

Various other concession stands are located behind center field and along the outer rim of the stadium along the base lines, collected in three concourses named Center Field Street, First Base Food Hall, and Third Base Food Hall. These stands frequently change from season to season, are often named after or maintained by stadium sponsors, or are themed after notable Rays figures, such as the Rocco Ball Deli, themed after former Rays player and coach Rocco Baldelli, which was open for the 2018 season until Baldelli was hired by the Minnesota Twins in 2019. Current and former concessions include the Taco Bus, the Wine Cellar, The Carvery, Pipo's, Papa John's Pizza, Fish Shack, Everglades BBQ, a full service liquor bar, Bay Grill and the Craft Beer Corner featuring many local craft brewery's including Big Storm Brewing, Cigar City, Green Bench, Sea Dog and 3 Daughters. Green Bench Brewing offers a special edition brew just for the Rays called 2-Seam Blonde Ale.

In addition to these concessions, Tropicana Field previously hosted a concession stand for Outback Steakhouse. Outback is a Tampa Bay-based establishment. To compete with established stadiums' hot dog traditions, the Trop introduced the "Sting 'Em" Dog in 2007. This consists of a regular hot dog topped with chili and cheese. It was renamed "The Heater" in 2008.

Ted Williams Museum/Hitters Hall of Fame
For a list of inductees and recipients of various awards, see footnote

The Ted Williams Museum and Hitters Hall of Fame opened in February 1994, in Hernando, Florida, in Citrus County—just a few blocks from the place where Williams lived in his later years.

In 2006, the museum and hall of fame were moved to Tropicana Field after its original facility in Hernando went bankrupt. A new  upstairs wing was opened in 2007, which now houses the exhibits on Ted Williams's careers with the Boston Red Sox and with the United States Marine Corps during World War II and the Korean War, as well as the monuments to the members of the Hitters Hall of Fame complete with memorabilia, with donated authentic memorabilia wherever possible and many of Williams's own personal mementos from his career and post-playing life. Williams did not induct himself into his own Hitters Hall of Fame, and was inducted in 2003 only after he died.

The museum also includes a "Pitching Wall of Great Achievement", the Negro leagues wing—including an exhibit about John Jordan "Buck" O'Neil (a "son" of Sarasota)—the "500 Homerun Club" exhibit, and exhibits about other topics, including the All-American Girls Professional Baseball League and the Tampa Bay Rays. The museum often hosts autograph signings and charity auctions during or before games.

The museum is open during game days, opening at the same time as the park and closing after the 7th inning with the concession stands. Admission is free, and the museum is open to all ticketholders. In 2012, the museum is open until the 9th inning, but still open only on game days. As of the last week of the 2012 season the museum was back to closing by the 7th inning (beginning of, not after the 7th inning) and the open only on game days policy is still in effect.

Notable events

Basketball
In 1998, Tropicana Field was a regional final site for the NCAA men's basketball tournament. A year later the stadium played host to the 1999 Final Four which saw the Connecticut Huskies beat the Duke Blue Devils 77–74 for the championship. Subsequently, no other NCAA men's basketball game has been played at Tropicana Field.

Football
ArenaBowl IX was held at the venue in 1995.

In 2008, the NCAA announced that Tropicana Field would be host to a postseason college bowl game, bringing football to the dome. The game, which eventually took on the name Gasparilla Bowl, was played inside Tropicana Field until 2017, after which the bowl organizers moved the annual contest to Raymond James Stadium in Tampa.

The Trop returned to a football configuration on October 30, 2009, to host one of the three home games of the Florida Tuskers of the United Football League, which the Rays had invested in.

The East–West Shrine Game, a postseason college football all-star game played annually since 1925, was played at Tropicana Field from 2012 until 2019.

Hockey
Tropicana Field, then known as the ThunderDome, holds the record for the highest attendance for a Stanley Cup playoffs game, set on April 23, 1996 with 28,183 fans. At the time this was the largest-ever crowd at an NHL game, which stood until the 2003 Heritage Classic. This still stands the attendance record for a game played at a teams' regular home stadium, as all NHL games with a higher attendance were part of the NHL's Winter Classic, Heritage Classic, or Stadium Series.

Motorsports
The World of Outlaws Sprint Cars raced at the Suncoast Dome on February 7–9, 1992 as a part of Florida Speedweeks with several tracks hosting events during the month.

An SCCA Trans-Am Series race was held from 1996 to 1997 on a temporary course encompassing the parking lot and surrounding streets.

Concerts
Tropicana Field has hosted many concerts over the years; one of the first large events upon its completion was a concert by Don Henley on June 29, 1990. Many well-known artists have held concerts at the venue, including Eric Clapton (twice), David Bowie, Janet Jackson (twice), Steely Dan, AC/DC (twice), Guns N' Roses, Billy Joel (twice), Robert Plant, Rush (twice), R.E.M., the Eagles, Depeche Mode, Rod Stewart, Kiss, and Van Halen (twice), among others. The venue's largest concert attendance was for the boy band New Kids on the Block in August 1990.

The number of large concerts at Tropicana Field has decreased considerably since the (Devil) Rays were established in 1998, as the club's 81-game home schedule makes scheduling difficult, especially during the summer concert season. Also, the development in nearby Tampa of Amalie Arena (opened in 1996)  and the MidFlorida Credit Union Amphitheatre (opened in 2004) into busy concert venues has further curtailed the concert slate at Tropicana Field.

Rays Summer Concert Series
Beginning in 2007, the Rays organized a "Summer Concert Series" in which a mix of major and lesser-known performers of many different musical genres performed after select home games for no extra charge beyond the price of the game ticket. The concerts were usually scheduled after Friday or Saturday night games, with more kid-oriented acts performing after Sunday afternoon games. The usual procedure was for a portable stage to be rolled out onto centerfield immediately after the final out of the ballgame, with the music starting soon thereafter. For most shows, fans were allowed to come down onto the playing field to watch the performance up close.

The first after-baseball concert featured nostalgia act Sha Na Na in June 2007. The event was so successful that the Rays booked a series of shows for the following season, usually increasing attendance for those games. Participating artists have included The Beach Boys, Los Lobos, LL Cool J, Sister Hazel, Kacey Musgraves, The Jacksons, REO Speedwagon, ZZ Top, Weezer, Kenny Loggins, Avril Lavigne, Joan Jett, and The Wiggles among many others, totaling over 80 shows in all.

In some seasons, the number of post-game concerts was as high as a dozen. The number dwindled to two in 2017, and before the 2018 season, the Rays announced that they would discontinue the concert series due to "stress on the artificial turf".

Professional wrestling 
On December 11, 2020, professional wrestling promotion WWE began broadcasting its weekly shows, Raw, SmackDown, and Main Event, and their associated pay-per-views (PPV) from Tropicana Field in a residency. The programs were filmed behind closed doors due to the COVID-19 pandemic in a bio-secure bubble called the WWE ThunderDome, which had been relocated from Orlando's Amway Center due to the start of the 2020–21 ECHL and NBA seasons as the Amway Center is the shared home of the Orlando Solar Bears and the Orlando Magic. Through the arrangement, Tropicana Field hosted the pay-per-views TLC: Tables, Ladders & Chairs, Royal Rumble, Elimination Chamber, and Fastlane—the final PPV before WrestleMania 37 (hosted by Raymond James Stadium in nearby Tampa)—as well as a special event called Superstar Spectacle and the 2021 WWE Hall of Fame induction ceremony. As the 2021 MLB season approached, on March 24, 2021, WWE announced that the ThunderDome would be relocated to the Yuengling Center in Tampa, beginning with the April 12 episode of Raw, the night after WrestleMania 37. WWE's final show filmed at Tropicana Field was the April 9 episode of SmackDown, which was taped the week prior on April 2.

Criticism

Location
The land the stadium and its parking lots now occupy was occupied by the Gas Plant neighborhood from the late 1800s until 1986.

In the late 1800s St. Petersburg began a large recruitment initiative to attract people to help build the city's infrastructures and fill lower-income service jobs. African Americans began to move to St. Petersburg from across the south looking to fill these jobs. The influx of African Americans in the area brought the formation of many black communities including the Gas Plant district. The area housed nearly 800 people, many African American-owned small businesses and three African American churches. The district's name came from the two fuel tanks that originally stood where Tropicana Field now stands.

In 1979, the St. Petersburg City Council voted to refurbish the neighborhood, as it had "seen better days." This plan promised to create new, modern, affordable housing and an industrial park that would bring many new jobs to the area. By 1982 developers offered no proposals for the refurbishment of the district to the city council, even after the council specifically requested the proposals. A group of Pinellas County business people offered a plan to the council that entailed building a baseball stadium, in hopes of attracting a major league baseball team to the area.  That year, the council voted unanimously to follow through with the baseball hopes and lease the land to the sports authority for $1 a year.

Most African Americans that used to live and/or work in the neighborhood felt betrayed by the city and bitter over the baseball development. The city had offered, and followed through with, many reparation programs for the residents and businesses of the Gas Plant district when the district was originally to be refurbished, including financial relocation help. But these programs were welcomed only on the basis that the area would be once again a functional community. When that stipulation changed residents were angered and new reparation plans were rumored but never came to fruition. As for the churches of the area, relocation offers extended to them from the City Council were "generous" according to one of the churches pastors. This is believed to be because of the political power that the churches held.

The destruction of the Gas Plant district and the city's shortcomings in securing economic and employment opportunities for the displaced African American community have left a jagged relationship between city officials and the aforementioned African American community. The destruction of the Gas Plant district financially crippled and killed many African American-owned small businesses and is often referred to as the main reason that only 10% of St. Petersburg's small businesses are African American-owned today.

The dome was built on the former site of a coal gasification plant and, in 1987, hazardous chemicals were found in the soil around the construction site. The city spent millions of dollars to remove the chemicals from the area.

It is often criticized as being located away from the Tampa Bay area's largest population base in Tampa.

Catwalks
Among the most cited criticisms about the stadium are the four catwalks that hang from the ceiling. The catwalks are part of the dome's support structure. The stadium was built with cable-stayed technology similar to that of the defunct Georgia Dome. It also supports the lighting and speaker systems. Because the dome is tilted toward the outfield, the catwalks are lower in the outfield.

The catwalks are lettered, with the highest inner ring being the A Ring, out to the farthest and lowest, the D Ring. The A Ring is entirely in play, while the B, C, and D Rings have yellow posts bolted to them to delineate the relative position of the foul lines. Any ball touching the A Ring, or the in-play portion of the B Ring, can drop for a hit or be caught for an out. The C and D Rings are out of play; if they are struck between the foul poles, then the ball is ruled a home run.

On August 5, 2010, Jason Kubel of the Minnesota Twins hit a sky-high infield pop-up that would have ended the inning in a 6–6 game if caught, but the ball struck the A ring and fell safely onto the infield allowing the Twins to score the go-ahead run and extend the inning in a controversial 8–6 win. As a result, on October 4, 2010, Major League Baseball approved a change in the ground rules for the A and B rings, making it so that a batted ball striking either of the two rings was automatically ruled a dead ball, regardless of whether the ball strikes in fair or foul territory. The rules pertaining to the C and D rings remained the same. This change lasted for just the 2010 postseason.

On the other hand, several potential hits have been lost as a result of the catwalks. For example, on May 12, 2006, Devil Rays outfielder Jonny Gomes hit a long fly ball against the Toronto Blue Jays that seemed destined to be a home run before it hit the B ring, got stuck momentarily, and then rolled off and was caught by Toronto shortstop John McDonald as Gomes was headed for home plate. Although Rays manager Joe Maddon tried to argue that it should have been at least a ground rule double since it stayed in the B Ring for a while before coming loose, umpires eventually ruled against the Rays and called Gomes out.

On May 26, 2008, Carlos Peña hit a pop-fly to center field that likely would have been caught by Texas Rangers center fielder Josh Hamilton. The ball instead hit the B ring catwalk and did not come down. Peña was mistakenly given a home run, but after deliberation, the umpires awarded him a ground rule double. This was the second time this had happened, as José Canseco hit a ball that stuck in the same catwalk on May 2, 1999.

Many players have hit the C and D rings for home runs. The first player ever to hit the rings for a home run was Edgar Martínez of the Seattle Mariners on May 29, 1998. Martinez's home run went off the D ring. Three players before him hit balls that went into the C ring. However, at the time, balls hitting the C ring were not ruled home runs. Two days prior to Martinez's home run, the ground rules were changed so that if a ball hit the C ring, it would be called a home run. The first player to hit the rings for a home run in postseason play was Rays third baseman Evan Longoria, who hit the C ring off Javier Vázquez of the Chicago White Sox on October 2, 2008, in the 3rd inning of Game 1 of the 2008 American League Division Series.

On July 17, 2011, during a nationally televised game against the Red Sox, Rays batter Sean Rodriguez hit a high foul popup that shattered a lightbulb on a catwalk. Pieces of the broken bulb fell to the turf near the third base coach's box. After a quick cleaning delay in which the Tropicana Field PA system played the theme to The Natural (a 1984 film that prominently features a hit baseball striking and shattering a stadium light fixture), the game resumed.

Another ceiling-related incident came in June 2018, when New York Yankees outfielder Clint Frazier's 9th-inning fly ball bounced off a speaker hanging from the B ring and was caught by Rays shortstop Adeiny Hechavarria for an out. Some suggest that the ball would have traveled far enough for a home run, which would have broken a 6–6 tie. The Rays won the game in extra innings with a walk-off home run.

Bullpens
The bullpens are located along (and close to) the left and right field foul lines and there are no barriers that separate them from the field of play. In fact, fly balls hit into the bullpens are in play. The bullpen players and the pitching mounds are obstacles for fielders chasing fly balls into the pen. Teams have to station a batboy behind the catchers in the bullpens to prevent them from being hit by foul balls from behind. This style of bullpen used to be common in the Major Leagues, but is currently in use only at Tropicana Field and RingCentral Coliseum in Oakland.

Interior

Another criticism of the stadium is the drab interior environment, especially early in the (Devil) Rays' existence, when the stark concrete interior was compared to a large warehouse. However, since it was designed specifically for baseball, it is somewhat smaller and the sightlines are better than in most domed stadiums, which are often built to accommodate other sports as well.

The current Rays' Stuart Sternberg-led ownership group has invested several million dollars over the past decade to make the venue more fan friendly. New or improved features include a larger scoreboard, video wall, catwalk sleeves, an outfield touch-tank featuring cownose rays, a walk-around that circles the entire field, two concession and gathering areas in the outfield, and many other additions and upgrades designed to improve the fan experience.

See also
Amalie Arena, home of the Tampa Bay Lightning and former home of the defunct Tampa Bay Storm
Raymond James Stadium, home of the Tampa Bay Buccaneers and the South Florida Bulls football team
Rays Ballpark, a former proposed new stadium for the Tampa Bay Rays that has since been abandoned
Rays Park at Carillon, a second former proposed stadium for the Tampa Bay Rays that was abandoned in mid-2015
Charlotte Sports Park, the spring training home of the Tampa Bay Rays, located in Port Charlotte, Florida

References

Citations

Sources

External links

Ballpark Digest review of Tropicana Field
Stadium site on MLB.com
Tropicana Field Seating Chart

Covered stadiums in the United States
Indoor ice hockey venues in Florida
Defunct National Hockey League venues
Sports venues completed in 1990
Sports venues in St. Petersburg, Florida
Defunct NCAA bowl game venues
Florida Tuskers stadiums
Music venues in Florida
Tampa Bay Rays stadiums
Baseball venues in Florida
Tropicana Products
PepsiCo buildings and structures
Major League Baseball venues
United Football League (2009–2012) venues
1990 establishments in Florida
NCAA Division I men's basketball tournament Final Four venues
1990 Davis Cup
Tampa Bay Lightning